The 2010–11 Stanford Cardinal men's basketball team represented Stanford University during the 2010–11 NCAA Division I men's basketball season. The Cardinal were led by third year head coach Johnny Dawkins, and played their home games at Maples Pavilion as a member of the Pacific-10 Conference.

Previous season
The Cardinal played in the Cancún Challenge and was able to reach the Championship round in the Riviera division and play against #5 ranked Kentucky, but lost in overtime 65–73.

Stanford finished below .500 in conference play for the second year in a row under coach Dawkins. They finished tied for 7th in conference play with Oregon and had the tiebreaker over them, beating them twice during the season. Stanford played Arizona State in the first round and upset the #2 seed Sun Devils 70–61. In the semifinals they played #3 seed Washington but lost 64–79.

Stanford finished under .500 overall for the first time since the 1992–93 season.

Offseason

Departures

Incoming

Roster

Schedule and results

|-
!colspan=12 style=| Exhibition

|-
!colspan=12 style=| Regular season

|-
!colspan=12 style=| Pac-10 tournament

Source:

References 

Stanford Cardinal men's basketball seasons
Stanford
Stanford Card
Stanford Card